Zitta is a female given name. 

The name may originate from the Italian word zitta meaning young girl or from the Hungarian pet name of Felicita, from Latin Felicia. In Basque, the word means saint. In Greek, the word means' the hunter'.

Name days 
Czech: 19 September
Latvian: 11 August
Slovak: 2 April
Catholic: 27 April
Hungary: 27 April
Lithuanian: 27 April

People with the name 
Saint Zita (c. 1212–1272), Italian saint and patron saint of maids
 Zita of Bourbon-Parma (1892–1989), Princess of Parma, last Empress-Consort of Austria-Hungary
 Zita Cobb, Canadian businesswoman
 Zita (Hittite prince), Hittite prince mentioned in one of the 14th century BC Amarna letters
 Zita Ajkler (born 1975), Hungarian retired long jumper, triple jumper, heptathlete and hurdler
 Zita Funkenhauser
 Zita Görög (born 1979), Hungarian actress and model
 Zyta Gilowska (1949-2016), Polish economist and politician
 Zita Gurmai (born 1965), Hungarian politician and Member of the European Parliament
 Zita Johann (1904–1993), Hungarian-born Broadway and film actress
 Zita Kabátová (1913-2012), Czech actress
 Zita Okaikoi, Ghanaian politician
 Zita Nelson, Spanish-Argentine soprano
 Zita Perczel (1918–1996), Hungarian actress
 Zita Pleštinská (born 1961), Slovak politician and Member of the European Parliament
 Zita Sattar (born 1975), English actress
 Zita Martins (born 1979), Portuguese astrobiologist
 Zita Seabra (born 1949), Portuguese politician
 Zita Szabó (born 1975), Hungarian retired triathlete
 Zita Szeleczky (1915-1999), Hungarian actress
 Zita Szucsánszki (born 1987), Hungarian handball player
 Zita Urbonaitė (1973–2008), Lithuanian road cyclist
 Zita Leeson Weinshienk (1935-2022), American judge

Fictional characters 
 Zita Flores, on the American children's animated TV show Kim Possible

External links 
Zita na Behind The Name

Feminine given names
Hungarian feminine given names
Italian feminine given names
Lithuanian feminine given names